Soumiya Iraoui (born 19 March 1996) is a Moroccan judoka. She is a silver medalist at the African Games and a five-time medalist, including two gold medals, at the African Judo Championships. She also represented Morocco at the 2020 Summer Olympics in Tokyo, Japan.

Career 

She won the gold medal in her event at the 2018 African Judo Championships held in Tunis, Tunisia. She also competed in the women's 57 kg event at the 2018 Mediterranean Games held in Tarragona, Catalonia, Spain.

In 2019, she won the silver medal in the women's 52 kg event at the African Judo Championships held in Cape Town, South Africa. She also won the silver medal in the women's 52 kg event at the 2019 African Games held in Rabat, Morocco. In that same month, she also competed in the women's 52 kg event at the 2019 World Judo Championships held in Tokyo, Japan. A month later, she won one of the bronze medals in her event at the 2019 Judo Grand Prix Tashkent held in Tashkent, Uzbekistan.

She also won the silver medal in this event at the 2020 African Judo Championships held in Antananarivo, Madagascar. In 2021, she competed in the women's 52 kg event at the Judo World Masters held in Doha, Qatar where she was eliminated in her first match by Réka Pupp of Hungary. At the 2021 African Judo Championships held in Dakar, Senegal, she won the gold medal in her event.

In 2021, she represented Morocco at the 2020 Summer Olympics in Tokyo, Japan. She competed in the women's 52 kg event. She won her first match against Kachakorn Warasiha of Thailand and she was then eliminated by Chelsie Giles of Great Britain. Giles went on to win one of the bronze medals in the event. A few months later, she lost her bronze medal match in her event at the Judo Grand Slam Abu Dhabi held in Abu Dhabi, United Arab Emirates.

She lost her bronze medal match in the women's 52 kg event at the 2022 Mediterranean Games held in Oran, Algeria.

Achievements

References

External links 
 
 
 
 
 
 Soumiya Iraoui at AllJudo.net 

Living people
1996 births
Moroccan female judoka
Place of birth missing (living people)
Competitors at the 2018 Mediterranean Games
African Games medalists in judo
African Games silver medalists for Morocco
Competitors at the 2019 African Games
Judoka at the 2020 Summer Olympics
Olympic judoka of Morocco
Competitors at the 2022 Mediterranean Games
Mediterranean Games competitors for Morocco
21st-century Moroccan women